António Maria Maurício de Aguilar (born 6 July 1978 in Lisbon) is a former Portuguese rugby union player. He played as a wing.

Career
Aguilar played in Grupo Desportivo Direito. After being National Champion twice in his first two senior seasons, he moved to Mont-de-Marsan, a second division French rugby club. He played in France for 2 years and then went back to Direito. He plays for Tarbes Pyrénées Rugby since 2007/08.

Aguilar had 84 caps for Portugal, from 1999 to 2014, scoring 24 tries, 120 points on aggregate. He was European Sevens Champion and European Champion of the Six Nations B, in 2004. He was a member of the Portuguese squad at the 2007 Rugby World Cup finals, playing three games and remaining scoreless.

References

External links

1978 births
Living people
Rugby union wings
Portuguese rugby union players
Portugal international rugby union players
Portugal international rugby sevens players
Rugby union players from Lisbon